Tarasovskaya is a rural locality (a village) in Yavengskoye Rural Settlement, Vozhegodsky District, Vologda Oblast, Russia. The population was 1 as of 2002.

Geography 
The distance to Vozhega is 41 km, to Baza is 26 km. Vasilyevskaya, Maleyevskaya, Ivanovskaya are the nearest rural localities.

References 

Rural localities in Vozhegodsky District